Marinobacter lacisalsi is a Gram-negative, non-spore-forming, aerobic and moderately halophilic bacterium from the genus of Marinobacter which has been isolated from the lake from Fuente de Piedra in Spain.

References

External links
Type strain of Marinobacter lacisalsi at BacDive -  the Bacterial Diversity Metadatabase

Further reading 
 

Alteromonadales
Bacteria described in 2009
Halophiles